Ensanche Isabelita is a sector or neighborhood in the city of Santo Domingo Este in the province of Santo Domingo of the Dominican Republic. This neighborhood is populated in particular by individuals from the middle classes.

References

External links 

Go Dominican Republic

Santo Domingo Este
Populated places in Santo Domingo